Galvin Park Reserve is a multi-use sporting reserve in Melbourne, Australia. It is mainly used for Australian rules football and Football and is the home ground for Werribee Centrals Sports Club and Werribee City FC. The stadium has a capacity of 1,000 people.

The venue was chosen as the training base for Morocco for the 2023 FIFA Women's World Cup.

References

External links
Werribee Centrals official page
Official Website of Werribee City
Soccerway page

Soccer venues in Melbourne
Werribee, Victoria
Sport in the City of Wyndham
Buildings and structures in the City of Wyndham
City of Wyndham